Durham Elementary School can refer to:

Durham Elementary School, a public kindergarten through sixth grade institution in Fremont, California.
A school in Durham, Maine